The Central District of Garmsar County is a district (bakhsh) in Garmsar County, Semnan Province, Iran. At the 2006 census, its population was 49,071, in 13,714 families.   The District has one city: Garmsar. The District has two rural districts (dehestan): Howmeh Rural District and Lajran Rural District.

References 

Districts of Semnan Province
Garmsar County